Eilean Ornsay is a rocky and uninhabited island located off the south-western coast of the Inner Hebridean island of Coll. It is situated on the western side of Loch Eatharna and is joined to Coll at low tide. Evidence of the dun and other archaeological finds were recently discovered by a field walk on the east side of Coll.

Archaeology

The island was recently visited by members of Coll Archaeology Association Shorewatch, resulting in the discovery of evidence of several archaeological sites which had previously been unrecorded.

References

External links

Coll Archaeology Association: Trip to Ornsay

Uninhabited islands of Argyll and Bute
Coll